Howard Bayne is the name of:

 Howard R. Bayne (1851–1933), American politician, lawyer and historian
 Howard Bayne (basketball) (1942–2018), American basketball player